Donglan Chen, also known as CIL Chen (1963 - ) is a Chinese former professor, artist and writer, and businesswoman who founded Shenzhen Duo Cai Fang Designing

About CIL 

In 1963, CIL was born in Huhhot of Inner Mongolia. In 1984, she graduated from Inner Mongolia University with a bachelor's degree in English Language and Literature, and became a teaching assistant right after graduation. She moved to Shenzhen in 1989 and started a design company in 1996. She emigrated to US in 2002. In 2008, she moved back to China and started her artist and writer career. Her literature, painting, and sculpture steps firmly on the oriental culture, actively promoting humanism and focusing on self-cultivation and spiritual progress. Until 2007, CIL had three full-length novels and two painting albums published. Her literary works were printed in the Journal of Literature and Art, and the paintings were issued in Art Research, Gallery etc. Her first solo exhibition was sponsored by the University Town Museum of Guangzhou Academy of Fine Arts, with Xiaoyan Yang as the curator, Johnson Chang as the academic chairman, and Zhengyao Zuo as the art director. The participants of the symposium included Shuangxi Yin, Hong Lu, Zhenhua Sun, Shaofeng Ji, Yuan Feng, and Bin Hu. Websites like artron.net, gd.qq.com, Sina News, toutiao.com published articles about this exhibition.

Artistic activities 
From 2017 to 2018, CIL's art pieces were selected to be part of Return to Ontology Art Exhibitions: Tracing the Source of Abstract Art in the New period of Guangdong, which is a cross cities and years group exhibition organized by the Lingnan Painting Academy, curated by Xiaoyan Yang and Bin Hu, and sponsored by the Lingnan Art Museum, Guanshanyue Art Museum and Art Museum of GAFA.

In July 2016, The Way of Nature: CIL Painting Exhibition was sponsored by the University Town Museum of Guangzhou Academy of Fine Arts with Zhengyao Zuo being the art director, Xiaoyan Yang being the Curator and Johnson Chang being the academic chair. Scholars and guests like Shuangxi Yin, Shaofeng Ji, Hong Lu, Zhenhua Sun, Yuan Feng, Bin Hu, Ziyu Zheng and Weiping He attended the opening ceremony and the symposium.

In August 2015, Dimension 22VR art show was held at South China Book Festival with the Lingnan Fine Arts Publishing House.

In March 2013, the performance art Incubation of Confucian businessmen was showcased in Guangzhou, China. The video got published on gd.qq.com.

In July 2016, Guangzhou Daily, artron.net, gd.qq.com, Sina News, toutiao.com, 3g.21cn.com, etc., published relevant reports and videos of the opening ceremony and interviews of "The Way of Nature: CIL Painting Exhibition".

Published books 
 In 2017, The Art of CIL, an art album, was published by the Lingnan Fine Arts Publishing House with Xiaoyan Yang as the Chief Editor.
 In 2016, Dimension 22, a full-length illustrated magic realist novel, was published by the Lingnan Fine Arts Publishing House.
 In 2013, Growing with China (Shang Hen), a full-length romantic realist novel, and CIL Oil Paintings & Notes were published by the Lingnan Fine Arts Publishing House.
 In 2010, Message from the Orient, a full-length financial novel, was published by the Guangzhou Publishing House.

Other publications 
 CIL's World by Zhenhua Sun, Issue 1, 2017, Art Research
 The Dimension of Spirit: On CIL's Art by Shuangxi Yin, Issue 10, 2016, Art China
 The Way of Nature: On CIL and Her Painting by Xiaoyan Yang, Issue 11, 2016, Art Monthly
 On CIL and Her Painting by Xiaoyan Yang, Art Overview, Boya Collection, July 3, 2016, Guangzhou Daily
 Q & A about CIL's "Jianyi Art", Issue 6 (two editions), 2014, Gallery
 Noted Artist CIL A15, Issue March 6, 2013, Yangcheng Evening News
 Son and Gold (Fable novella), Page 1, Novel section, Issue March 8, 2010, Journal of Literature and Art

Milestones

References 

1963 births
Living people
Artists from Inner Mongolia
People from Hohhot
21st-century Chinese writers
21st-century Chinese artists
20th-century Chinese women artists
20th-century Chinese artists
21st-century Chinese women artists
21st-century Chinese women writers
Inner Mongolia University alumni
Writers from Inner Mongolia